The Pied Piper is a 1972 British film directed by Jacques Demy and starring Jack Wild, Donald Pleasence and John Hurt and featuring Donovan and Diana Dors. It is loosely based on the legend of the Pied Piper.

Cast
 Jack Wild as Gavin
 Donald Pleasence as The Baron
 John Hurt as Franz
 Donovan as The Piper
 Michael Hordern as Melius, Alchemist
 Roy Kinnear as Burgermaster Poppendick
 Peter Vaughan as Bishop
 Diana Dors as Frau Poppendick
 Cathryn Harrison as Lisa
 Keith Buckley as Mattio, Gypsy Leader
 Peter Eyre as Pilgrim
 John Welsh as Chancellor
 Hamilton Dyce as Papal Nuncio
 Arthur Hewlett as Otto
 Sammie Winmill as Gretel
 André van Gyseghem as Friar
 Roger Hammond as Burger
 John Falconer as Priest

References

External links

1972 films
British fantasy drama films
Films directed by Jacques Demy
Films set in the Middle Ages
Films based on Pied Piper of Hamelin
Films set in the Holy Roman Empire
Films produced by David Puttnam
Films produced by Sanford Lieberson
Paramount Pictures films
1970s English-language films
1970s British films